Kohl Island is an island located in Range 3 Coast Land District, British Columbia, Canada.

See also
List of islands of British Columbia

References

Islands of British Columbia